Caitlin Greiser (born 17 February 1999) is an Australian rules footballer playing for the Richmond Football Club in the AFL Women's (AFLW). Greiser signed with St Kilda during the first period of the 2019 expansion club signing period in August.

She was the AFLW's leading goalkicker in 2020 with 10 goals. In April 2020, she was named an All-Australian. The 2020 AFL Women's season saw Greiser obtain her first AFL Women's All-Australian team selection, named in the full forward position.

In March 2023, Greiser was traded to Richmond.

References

External links 

1999 births
Living people
St Kilda Football Club (AFLW) players
Melbourne University Football Club (VFLW) players
Western Jets players (NAB League Girls)
Australian rules footballers from Victoria (Australia)